Centaurea uniflora, the singleflower knapweed, is a perennial herbaceous plant belonging to the genus Centaurea of the family Asteraceae.

Description
Centaurea uniflora reaches a height of 40–50 cm. It is densely covered with short rough hair. The stem is erect, leafy and has only one showy purplish-pink flower. The green-gray leaves are  dotted, narrowly lanceolate and smaller than one centimeter. The flowering period extends from July to September. The achenes are grayish brown.

Distribution
Centaurea uniflora is distributed in Austria, Albania, Bulgaria, Montenegro, France, Greece, Italy, Hungary, North Macedonia, Romania, Slovenia, Serbia and Switzerland.

Habitat
This alpine plant occurs in the mountainous areas of the south-east Europe at altitudes above 1500 m, on warm, dry and nutrient-rich soils found in meadows and hillsides.

Subspecies
 Centaurea uniflora subsp. davidovii  (Urum.) Dostál
 Centaurea uniflora subsp. ferdinandi  (Gren.) Bonnier
 Centaurea uniflora subsp. nervosa  (Willd.) Bonnier et Layens
 Centaurea uniflora subsp. uniflora

References
 Centaurea uniflora
 Pignatti S. - Flora d'Italia (3 vol.) - Edagricole – 1982

External links

 Biolib
 Plants

uniflora
Flora of Italy